The Bitch Is Back is the second and final album released by rapper Roxanne Shanté. It was released on October 5, 1992, on Cold Chillin' Records sub-label Livin' Large, was distributed by Tommy Boy/Warner Bros. Records, and featured production by  Kool G Rap, Grand Daddy IU, Large Professor, Mister Cee, Trackmasters, and Grandmaster Flash.

Track listing
"Intro" (Produced By Mister Cee)
"Deadly Rhymes" - (Featuring Kool G Rap) (Produced By Kool G Rap, Large Professor)  
"Big Mama" (Produced By Grand Daddy I.U., Kay Cee)
"Trick or Treat" (Produced By Kool G Rap)
"Gotta be Free" (Produced By Grandmaster Flash)
"Dance to This" (Produced By Grand Daddy I.U., Kay Cee)  
"Yes, Yes, Y'all" (Produced By Mister Cee)
"Straight Razor" (Produced By Trackmasters)  
"Shanté Gets Wicked" (Produced By Mister Cee)
"Brothers Ain't Shit" (Produced By Kool G Rap, Large Professor)

References

1992 albums
Roxanne Shanté albums
Albums produced by Large Professor
Albums produced by Trackmasters
Cold Chillin' Records albums